Neriman Ovando (born March 23, 1991) is a Dominican footballer who currently plays for Bauger FC, and has for his entire career. He has been capped once by the Dominican Republic national football team in a match against Curaçao.

References

Living people
1991 births
Dominican Republic footballers
Dominican Republic international footballers
Association football midfielders
Bauger FC players